Prokhorovka is the name of several inhabited localities in Russia.

Urban localities
Prokhorovka, Belgorod Oblast, a settlement in Prokhorovsky District of Belgorod Oblast

Rural localities
Prokhorovka, Irkutsk Oblast, a village in Osinsky District of Irkutsk Oblast
Prokhorovka, Kaliningrad Oblast, a settlement in Nizovsky Rural Okrug of Guryevsky District of Kaliningrad Oblast
Prokhorovka, Orenburg Oblast, a selo in Konstantinovsky Selsoviet of Sharlyksky District of Orenburg Oblast
Prokhorovka, Rostov Oblast, a selo in Proletarskoye Rural Settlement of Krasnosulinsky District of Rostov Oblast
Prokhorovka, Tula Oblast, a village in Prokhorovsky Rural Okrug of Novomoskovsky District of Tula Oblast